Nagya Al Rabiea is a well-known Saudi Arabian actress and film director. She has participated in more than 100 films and television series.

Background 
Nagya AlRabiea was born in 1955 in Ta'if, Saudi Arabia. She graduated  from University of San Francisco in 1984 and started her professional acting career in 1988.

Selected filmography

Actress 
 Hubun bila hudud (2018)
 Harat al-shaykh (2016)
 Enty Taleq (2013)
 Riches of Desert 4 - Challenge (2012)
 Min alaakhir (2012)
 Sun shines twice (2010)
 Days of Mirage (2009)
 El-nass Fi Kafar Askar (2003)
 Fares Bela Gawad (2002)
 Tash Ma Tash 4 (1997)
 The liberty apartment (1996)
 Eve and the apple (1996)
 Aswar Alzulm (1995)

Director 
 إللي ماله أول ماله تالي
 عاد ولكن

References 
The information in this article is based on that in its Arabic equivalent.

Living people
1955 births
Saudi Arabian film actresses
Saudi Arabian television actresses
Saudi Arabian film directors
Saudi Arabian women film directors
20th-century actresses
21st-century actresses
San Francisco State University alumni
People from Taif